The SC Eltersdorf is a German association football club from the Eltersdorf district of Erlangen, Bavaria.

An amateur club who has mostly played in the lower leagues of Bavaria, the club achieved its greatest success in 2011–12 when it earned promotion to the Regionalliga.

History
While football was played in Eltersdorf as early as 1909, in the form of the Franken Eltersdorf, the current club dates back to 1926. With support from another local working maes club, the ATSV Erlangen, ATSV Eltersdorf was formed in 1926.

The new club only lasted for a decade before the Nazis outlawed it because of its working-class background. A new club was formed instead, the DTV 1936 Eltersdorf. This club, in turned only lasted for another decade before it disappeared with the end of the Second World War. On 3 March 1946, the current Sportklub Eltersdorf was formed, which nevertheless saw its roots in the old 1926 club, which it claims as its formation year. Most likely, the current name, Sport-Club 1926 e.V. Eltersdorf, was adopted in 1963.

SCE spend the better part of its existence as a non-descript amateur side in the lower league of Bavarian football until 1999, when a championship in the Bezirksliga Mittelfranken-Nord (VII) gained it promotion to the Bezirksoberliga Mittelfranken. At this level, the club spent only two seasons before another title moved the team up to the tier-five Landesliga Bayern-Mitte.

SC Eltersdorf spend the next ten seasons at this level without looking like a promotion contender. In 2007–08 the club came close to relegation, finishing 15th in the league. Gradual improvement saw the team finish fifth in 2010 before taking the out the league title in the following year and gaining entry to Bavaria's highest football league.

In 2009, the club was also able to take out the Middle Franconian Cup, a competition since replaced by the enlarged Bavarian Cup, making SCE the last winners. After the promotion of Eltersdorf to the Bayernliga in 2011 the club began to hold merger talks with FSV Erlangen-Bruck in November 2011.

At the end of the 2011–12 season the club managed to finish in the top nine of the Bayernliga and thereby directly qualified for the new tier four Regionalliga Bayern. In the 2012–13 season the club struggled in the bottom region of the table all season and was eventually relegated back to the Bayernliga.

Honors
The club's honors:

Recent managers
Recent managers of the club:

Recent seasons
The recent season-by-season performance of the club:

With the introduction of the Bezirksoberligas in 1988 as the new fifth tier, below the Landesligas, all leagues below dropped one tier. With the introduction of the Regionalligas in 1994 and the 3. Liga in 2008 as the new third tier, below the 2. Bundesliga, all leagues below dropped one tier. With the establishment of the Regionalliga Bayern as the new fourth tier in Bavaria in 2012 the Bayernliga was split into a northern and a southern division, the number of Landesligas expanded from three to five and the Bezirksoberligas abolished. All leagues from the Bezirksligas onwards were elevated one tier.

References

Sources
 Grüne, Hardy (2001).  Vereinslexikon. Kassel: AGON Sportverlag 
 Die Bayernliga 1945–97  DSFS, published: 1998

External links
 Official team site  
 Das deutsche Fußball-Archiv  historical German domestic league tables
 Manfreds Fussball Archiv  Tables and results from the Bavarian amateur leagues
 SC Eltersdorf at Weltfussball.de 

Football clubs in Germany
Football clubs in Bavaria
Association football clubs established in 1926
Football in Middle Franconia
1926 establishments in Germany
Erlangen
Sports clubs banned by the Nazis